Group A of the 2003 FIFA Confederations Cup took place between 18 and 22 June 2003. France won the group, and advanced to the knockout stage, along with group runners-up Colombia. Japan and New Zealand failed to advance.

Standings

Results

New Zealand v Japan

France v Colombia

Colombia v New Zealand

France v Japan

France v New Zealand

Japan v Colombia

References

A
2002–03 in French football
2003 in Japanese football
2003 in Colombian football
2003 in New Zealand association football